Mallika Chabba is an Indian painter from Dehradun, India.

Early life and career
Mallika grew up in the town of Dehradun, which lies in North India in a valley at the foothills of the Himalayan range. She started to paint from a very young age with the ambition to become an accomplished artist. Mallika attended the Government College of Fine Art, Chandigarh where she specialized as a sculptor. She completed the college with a Bachelor of Fine Art degree after which she moved to New Delhi to join the Indian National Trust for Art and Cultural Heritage (INTACH). Mallika learnt art restoration while working on oil paintings from the 18th century. She continued to paint and had her first solo exhibition for the charity group Child Health and Welfare Foundation.

Chabba contributed to the group "Bollywood art project" who are transforming the walls of Mumbai into colorful art work. She has also done an exclusive painting for the Bollywood movie BAKRA titled The Divine Goat.

Exhibitions

References

Living people
20th-century Indian women artists
21st-century Indian women artists
21st-century Indian painters
Artists from Allahabad
Indian women painters
Indian women contemporary artists
Indian contemporary painters
Artists from Dehradun
Women artists from Uttar Pradesh
Painters from Uttar Pradesh
Year of birth missing (living people)